Linguère Airport  is an airport serving the city of Linguère in Senegal.

See also
Transport in Senegal

References

  Great Circle Mapper - Linguère
 Google Earth

Airports in Senegal